Long Lake Provincial Park is a provincial park located in Alberta, Canada.
Long Lake is located one and one half hours from Edmonton along Highway 831, south of the village of Boyle and northeast of the hamlet of Newbrook, within Thorhild County.

It was established on March 25, 1957, and is maintained by the Alberta Parks Division of Alberta Environment and Parks.

Recreation
Recreation activities available at the park include:
Camping, Canoeing/Kayaking, Cross Country Skiing, Downhill Skiing, Fishing, Group Use, Hiking - Front Country, Horseshoes, Ice Fishing, Mountain Biking/Cycling, Power Boating, Sailing, Snowmobiling (Off-site), Swimming and Water Skiing  
 
There is also the Long Lake Ski Area, a downhill and cross country ski area for recreation during the winter months with a chalet and cafe.  A golf course and horse stables are also located nearby.

Facilities and Services
Boat Launch Boat Launch, Change Rooms, Cook Shelters, Fast Food Concession, Firepits, Firewood Sold, Fish Cleaning Stations, Flush Toilets, Golf Course, Grocery/supply store, Hand Launch,   Horseshoe Pitch, Laundry, Pay Phone, Picnic Shelter, Pier, Pit/Vault Toilets, Playground, Power, Sewage Disposal, Showers, Warmup Shelter, Water (TapWater), Wheelchair Accessible

See also
List of provincial parks in Alberta
List of Canadian provincial parks
List of Canadian national parks

References

External links

Provincial parks of Alberta
Thorhild County